In mathematics, the Euler numbers are a sequence En of integers  defined by the Taylor series expansion

,

where  is the hyperbolic cosine function. The Euler numbers are related to a special value of the Euler polynomials, namely:

The Euler numbers appear in the Taylor series expansions of the secant and hyperbolic secant functions. The latter is the function in the definition. They also occur in combinatorics, specifically when counting the number of alternating permutations of a set with an even number of elements.

Examples 
The odd-indexed Euler numbers are all zero. The even-indexed ones  have alternating signs. Some values are:
{|
|E0 ||=||align=right| 1
|-
|E2 ||=||align=right| −1
|-
|E4 ||=||align=right| 5
|-
|E6 ||=||align=right| −61
|-
|E8 ||=||align=right| 
|-
|E10 ||=||align=right| 
|-
|E12 ||=||align=right| 
|-
|E14 ||=||align=right| 
|-
|E16 ||=||align=right| 
|-
|E18 ||=||align=right| 
|}
Some authors re-index the sequence in order to omit the odd-numbered Euler numbers with value zero, or change all signs to positive . This article adheres to the convention adopted above.

Explicit formulas

In terms of Stirling numbers of the second kind
Following two formulas express the Euler numbers in terms of Stirling numbers of the second kind 

where  denotes the Stirling numbers of the second kind, and  denotes the rising factorial.

As a double sum
Following two formulas express the Euler numbers as double sums

As an iterated sum
An explicit formula for Euler numbers is:

As a sum over partitions

where in both cases  and

is a multinomial coefficient.

As an example,

As a determinant
 is given by the determinant

As an integral
 is also given by the following integrals:

Congruences
W. Zhang  obtained the following combinational identities concerning the Euler numbers, for any prime , we have

W. Zhang and Z. Xu proved that, for any prime  and integer , we have

where  is the Euler's totient function.

Asymptotic approximation

The Euler numbers grow quite rapidly for large indices as
they have the following lower bound

Euler zigzag numbers

where  is the Euler zigzag numbers, beginning with
1, 1, 1, 2, 5, 16, 61, 272, 1385, 7936, 50521, 353792, 2702765, 22368256, 199360981, 1903757312, 19391512145, 209865342976, 2404879675441, 29088885112832, ... 

For all even ,

where  is the Euler number; and for all odd ,

where  is the Bernoulli number.

For every n,

See also
 Bell number
 Bernoulli number
 Dirichlet beta function
 Euler–Mascheroni constant

References

External links
 
 

Integer sequences
Leonhard Euler